The 1940 Rhode Island Rams football team was an American football team that represented Rhode Island State College (later renamed the University of Rhode Island) as a member of the New England Conference during the 1940 college football season. In its 21st season under head coach Frank Keaney, the team compiled a 5–3 record (2–1 against conference opponents) and finished in second place in the conference. The team played its home games at Meade Stadium in Kingston, Rhode Island.

Schedule

References

Rhode Island State
Rhode Island Rams football seasons
Rhode Island State Rams football